Tibor Dezamits (born 7 November 1954) is a Hungarian boxer. He competed in the men's lightweight event at the 1980 Summer Olympics. At the 1980 Summer Olympics, he defeated Alphonse Matoubela of Congo, before losing to Yordan Lesov of Bulgaria.

References

External links
 

1954 births
Living people
Hungarian male boxers
Olympic boxers of Hungary
Boxers at the 1980 Summer Olympics
People from Kapuvár
Lightweight boxers
Sportspeople from Győr-Moson-Sopron County